Mar Adolph Medlycott was the first Bishop of the Catholic Apostolic Vicariate of Thrissur. He was born at Chittagong on 15 May 1838. Medlycott spent his last days in Bangalore where he died on 4 May 1918. His remains were later reinterred, first in the Basilica of Our Lady of Dolours in 1945.

Books
 India and the Apostle Thomas: An Inquiry, with a Critical Analysis of the Acta Thomae by A. E. Medlycott; Published 1905 by David Nutt. Reprinted unabridged in the Indian Church History Classics, Vol.I, Ed. G. Menachery, Ollur, 1998.
 Saint Thomas Christians, A. E. Medlycott (1912), Catholic Encyclopedia: An International Work of Reference on the Constitution, Doctrine, Discipline, and History of the Catholic Church, Robert Appleton Company. Volume 14, pp 678 – 688

External links
 India and the Apostle Thomas by A. E. Medlycott. Also available at Internet Archive.
 Saint Thomas Christians, A. E. Medlycott (1912), Catholic Encyclopedia: An International Work of Reference on the Constitution, Doctrine, Discipline, and History of the Catholic Church, Robert Appleton Company. Volume 14, pp 678 – 688. Also available at Internet Archive

Notes

1838 births
1918 deaths
Archbishops of Thrissur
People from Chittagong
19th-century Roman Catholic bishops in India
20th-century Roman Catholic bishops in India